Ron Casey (November 27, 1952 – February 16, 2014) was an American politician who served in the Missouri House of Representatives from 2004 until 2012. He was a member of the Democratic Party and represented southeastern Jefferson County, Missouri. Born in Dayton, Texas, Casey graduated from Festus High School in 1971. He then went to Tennessee Temple University.  He worked for more than 22 years in Jefferson County government.

Casey died February 16, 2014, at Mercy Hospital St. Louis in Creve Coeur, Missouri, as a result of complications from head injuries from a fall.

References

People from Jefferson County, Missouri
People from Dayton, Texas
Tennessee Temple University alumni
Democratic Party members of the Missouri House of Representatives
1952 births
2014 deaths
Accidental deaths in Missouri
Accidental deaths from falls